The National Ninja League (NNL) is a not-for-profit organization dedicated to growing ninja as a sport. In contrast to American Ninja Warrior, the NNL provides multiple competitions each season for athletes as young as 6 years old under a unified rule set.

Ninja as a sport
Ninja is a form of obstacle course racing inspired by the Ninja Warrior reality TV shows. 

The scoring rules for the sport vary between different leagues that can be regional, national, or international.  Two of the largest and most established leagues are the Ultimate Ninja Athlete Association and the National Ninja League, both started in 2015.  Some rule sets that are more forgiving provide one or more points for completing an obstacle or progressing to a certain point on an obstacle.  Others make athletes retry an obstacle that they miss.  Most courses have a time limit between 1 and 5 minutes, though "endurance" courses (often an additional stage in a multi-stage event) can go longer.

In the National Ninja League, one's score is the number of obstacles that they cleared and the time that it took to complete those obstacles. Once they fail a single obstacle, their run is over.

Ninja competitions generally take place at dedicated training facilities, some of which are owned by competitors who started on American Ninja Warrior.

History
The National Ninja League was created by Chris and Brian Wilczewski, competitors on American Ninja Warrior and owners of the Movement Laboratory training facility, in the fall of 2015 as a way for competitors and fans of the show to have a unified off-season league between taping seasons. The first season had 15 qualifying events at 12 affiliate facilities and culminated in a World Championship at the Movement Laboratory in Hainesport, New Jersey in February 2016.

Season 2 saw the introduction of three youth divisions for athletes as young as 6 years old. The first championships for youth athletes were held at the Gymnastics Academy of Fairfield (Connecticut) for the Kids and Preteens divisions and iCore Fitness in West Chester, PA for the Teen division. Due to the popularity of ninja among youth athletes, two additional divisions - Mature Kids and Young Adults - were added the following season. Youth athletes now account for over 70% of the league's participation.

The league has rapidly expanded from 12 affiliate facilities in Season 1 to over 80 affiliate facilities in Season 5 in 27 states and 6 countries. The league also has partnerships with the Ninja Challenge League in Australia, French Ninja League, and Barbados Ninja Throwdown.

Format
At a National Ninja League qualifying competition, each athlete will run an obstacle course consisting of 10-20 obstacles in a predetermined order. Athletes receive only one attempt at each obstacle (with the exception of the Warped Wall) and must advance from the start platform to the finish platform with whatever means are available to them. The athlete in each division that advances the farthest into the course in the fastest amount of time, or the athlete that completes the entire course in the fastest amount of time, is declared the winner. The top three athletes in each division qualify for the annual World Championship at the end of the season; athletes that have already qualified defer their spots to the next available athlete.

One hallmark of the National Ninja League compared to other ninja organizations is that competitors cannot be told the path by which they must defeat an obstacle. For instance, on a set of monkey bars, the athlete cannot be told that they must touch each bar, start on the first bar, and/or finish on the last bar. Athletes can only be told the start and finish platforms, what they can and cannot use, and whether they can only use their hands or feet on a specific part of the obstacle. Occasionally, several obstacles will be linked together, in which case the athlete clears one obstacle in a set of obstacle by hand or foot placement on the next obstacle; the series of obstacles must ultimately finish on a finish platform.

World Championship
Each season ends with the World Championship, a three-stage event in which competitors must complete all obstacles of each stage within the time limit to advance to the next stage. The athlete in each division that progresses the furthest the fastest is crowned that season's World Champion. In contrast from regular season competitions, each stage has 6-10 obstacles.

 Stage 1 consists of mostly lower-body and agility obstacles, as competitors race against the clock to demonstrate a basic set of skills. Time limits are usually 1 1/2 to 2 minutes.
 Stage 2 tests the athlete's power and explosiveness; time limits range wildly dependent on if this stage tests speed, endurance, or both.
 Stage 3 is an upper-body gauntlet with the World Champion determined by who can endure through some of the most difficult obstacles ever conceived. To date, no adult athlete has defeated Stage 3.

The World Championship is annually one of the largest ninja competitions in the world. The 2019 World Championship was the largest ninja event ever with 1,544 athletes.

Prior to 2019, the World Championship was split between an adult event and a youth event, both at a dedicated ninja facility. The 2019 event, hosted by Real Life Ninja Academy, was held at the XL Center Exhibition Hall in Hartford, Connecticut with both youth and adult athletes competing. Starting with the 2020 World Championship, the National Ninja League is the sole hosting entity with the tradition of hosting all age divisions in a convention center continuing at the Greensboro Coliseum Special Events Center in Greensboro, North Carolina.

Results
Although World Championships are contested in every division, this lists only the Adult (Season 1-5) or Elite (Season 6-) results.

Rec Ninja League
Launched in spring 2018, the Rec Ninja League is designed for beginner to intermediate athletes that might not be ready for the challenges that an NNL course would provide. The Rec Ninja League operates in a similar manner to the NNL with the same rules surrounding obstacles with the exception that each course is 10 obstacles long, 9 of which are easier than a standard NNL course, and the athlete will attempt each of the 10 obstacles for points. Athletes earn one point per obstacle cleared and five bonus points for defeating all ten obstacles on the course. The athlete in each division and region that accrues the most points over multiple competitions will be crowned Obstacle King/Queen, and the top three athletes that did not qualify for the previous season's World Championship earn qualification to the following season's World Championship.

In its second season, the Rec League had over 500 athletes, many of which competed in their first regular season NNL competition in the ensuing season.

Differences from American Ninja Warrior
 No applications are required to compete in the National Ninja League; athletes merely need to register for the competition at their local NNL-affiliated facility.
 Athletes are not only allowed but encouraged to compete in multiple competitions in a season, compared to American Ninja Warrior in which competitors may only compete in one regional qualifying round.
 The NNL has 100+ qualifying events each season compared to 5-6 for American Ninja Warrior.
 Each qualifying course can have between 10 and 20 obstacles, leading to a variety of different styles of courses from speed courses (with approximate completion times of 1 1/2 to 2 minutes) to endurance courses (with approximate completion times of 6 to 8 minutes).
 Events are live streamed on Facebook or YouTube with full results available on the NNL's website, negating the need for airing on tape delay and non-disclosure agreements.

Notes

1. For instance, if the athletes in first, third, and fifth places have already qualified, the qualification spots go to the athletes in second, fourth, and sixth place. Athletes must complete at least one obstacle in order to qualify.

2. Part of the San Francisco Bay area.

3. Despite being under 18, Rachel was grandfathered into the Adult division.

4. Part of the Atlanta metropolitan area.

5. Hosted by the Real Life Ninja Academy.

References

Ninja